The men's ten-pin singles event  in bowling at the 2005 World Games took place from 19 to 20 July 2005 at the RRZ / Bowling Center in Duisburg, Germany.

Competition format
A total of 22 athletes entered the competition. Best ten athletes from preliminary round qualifies to the round-robin. In round-robin each player plays ten matches. For a win player gets 10 points and for a draw 5 points. Total pins and bonus points are counted as final result. From this stage the best three athletes advances to the finals.

Results

Preliminary

Semifinal

Finals

References

External links
 Results on IWGA website

Bowling at the 2005 World Games